Mulberry harbours were two temporary portable harbours developed by the British Admiralty and War Office during the Second World War to facilitate the rapid offloading of cargo onto beaches during the Allied invasion of Normandy in June 1944. After the Allies successfully held beachheads following D-Day, two prefabricated harbours were taken in sections across the English Channel from southern England with the invading armies and assembled off Omaha Beach (Mulberry "A") and Gold Beach (Mulberry "B").

The Mulberry harbours were to be used until major French ports could be captured and brought back into use after repair of the inevitable sabotage by German defenders. The Mulberry B harbour at Gold Beach was used for 10 months after D-Day, and over 2.5 million men, 500,000 vehicles, and 4 million tons of supplies were landed before it was fully decommissioned. The still only partially-completed Mulberry A harbour at Omaha Beach was damaged on 19 June by a violent storm that suddenly arrived from the north-east. After three days the storm finally abated and damage was found to be so severe that the harbour had to be abandoned.

Background
The Dieppe Raid of 1942 had shown that the Allies could not rely on being able to penetrate the Atlantic Wall to capture a port on the north French coast. The problem was that large ocean-going ships of the type needed to transport heavy and bulky cargoes and stores needed sufficient depth of water under their keels, together with dockside cranes, to off-load their cargo, and these were not available, except at the already heavily-defended French harbours. Thus, the Mulberries were created to provide the port facilities necessary to offload the thousands of men and vehicles, and millions of tons of supplies necessary to sustain Operation Overlord. The harbours were made up of all the elements one would expect of any harbour: breakwater, piers and roadways.

Preparation

With the planning of Operation Overlord at an advanced stage by the summer of 1943, it was accepted that the proposed artificial harbours would need to be prefabricated in Britain and then towed across the English Channel.

The need for two separate artificial harbours – one American and one British/Canadian – was agreed at the Quebec Conference in August 1943. An Artificial Harbours Sub-Committee was set up under the Chairmanship of the civil engineer Colin R. White, brother of Sir Bruce White, to advise on the location of the harbours and the form of the breakwater; the Sub-Committee's first meeting was held at the Institution of Civil Engineers (ICE) on 4 August 1943. The minutes of the Sub-Committee's meetings show that initially it was envisaged that bubble breakwaters would be used, then blockships were proposed, and finally, due to an insufficient number of block ships being available, a mix of blockships and purpose-made concrete caisson units.

On 2 September 1943 the Combined Chiefs of Staff estimated that the artificial ports (Mulberries) would need to handle 12,000 tons per day, exclusive of motor transport, and in all weathers. On 4 September the go-ahead was given to start work immediately on the harbours. However, infighting between the War Office and the Admiralty over responsibility was only resolved on 15 December 1943 by the intervention of the Vice-Chiefs of Staff. The decision was that the Admiralty managed the blockships, Bombardons and assembly of all constituent parts on the south coast of England. Further the Admiralty would undertake all necessary work to survey, site, tow and mark navigation.

The War Office was given the task of constructing the concrete caissons (Phoenixes), the roadways (Whales) and protection via anti-aircraft installations. Once at the site, the army was responsible for sinking the caissons and assembling all the various other units of the harbours.

For the Mulberry A at Omaha Beach, the naval Corps of Civil Engineers would construct the harbour from the prefabricated parts.

The proposed harbours called for many huge caissons of various sorts to build breakwaters and piers and connecting structures to provide the roadways. The caissons were built at a number of locations, mainly existing ship building facilities or large beaches, like Conwy Morfa, around the British coast. The works were let out to commercial construction firms, including Wates Construction Balfour Beatty, Henry Boot, Bovis & Co, Cochrane & Sons, Costain, Cubitts, French, Holloway Brothers, John Laing & Son, Peter Lind & Company, Sir Robert McAlpine, Melville Dundas & Whitson, Mowlem, Nuttall, Parkinson, Halcrow Group, Pauling & Co. and Taylor Woodrow. On completion they were towed across the English Channel by tugs to the Normandy coast at only , assembled, operated and maintained by the Corps of Royal Engineers, under the guidance of Reginald D. Gwyther, who was appointed CBE for his efforts. Various elements of the "Whale" piers were designed and constructed by a group of companies led by Braithwaite & Co, West Bromwich and Newport.

Beach surveys
Both locations for the temporary harbours required detailed information concerning geology, hydrography and sea conditions. To collect this data a special team of hydrographers was created in October 1943. The 712th Survey Flotilla, operated from naval base HMS Tormentor in Hamble, were detailed to collect soundings off the enemy coast. Between November 1943 and January 1944 this team used a Landing Craft Personnel (Large), or LCP(L), to survey the Normandy coast.

The special LCP(L) was manned by a Royal Navy crew and a small group of hydrographers. The first sortie, Operation KJF, occurred on the night of 26/27 November 1943 when three LCP(L)s took measurements off the port of Arromanches, the location for Mulberry B. A follow-up mission, Operation KJG, to the proposed location for Mulberry A happened on 1/2 December but a navigation failure meant the team sounded an area 2,250 yards west of the correct area.

Two attempts had to be made to take soundings off the Pointe de Ver. The first sortie, Operation Bellpush Able, on 25/26 December had problems with their equipment and returned on 28/29 December to complete the task.

On New Year's Eve 1943, a Combined Operations Pilotage Party (COPP), left Gosport for the Gold Beach area at Luc-sur-Mer. Two soldiers of the Royal Engineers, Major Scott-Bowden and Sergeant Ogden-Smith, were landed on the beach at night in Operation Postage Able and took samples of the sand. These were crucial in determining whether the armoured vehicles would be able to operate on the beach or become bogged down. The final survey, Operation Bellpush Charlie, occurred on the night of 30–31 January but limited information was gathered due to fog and because German lookouts heard the craft. Further sorties were abandoned.

Design and development

An early idea for temporary harbours was sketched by Winston Churchill in a 1915 memo to Lloyd George. This memo was for artificial harbours to be created off the German islands of Borkum and Sylt. No further investigation was made and the memo was filed away.

In 1940 the civil engineer Guy Maunsell wrote to the War Office with a proposal for an artificial harbour, but the idea was not at first adopted.
Churchill issued his memo "Piers for use on beaches" on 30 May 1942, apparently in some frustration at the lack of progress being made on finding a solution to the temporary harbour problem. Between 17 June and 6 August 1942, Hugh Iorys Hughes submitted a design concept for artificial harbours to the War Office.

At a meeting following the Dieppe Raid of 19 August 1942, Vice-Admiral John Hughes-Hallett (the naval commander for the Dieppe Raid) declared that if a port could not be captured, then one should be taken across the Channel. Hughes-Hallett had the support of Churchill. The concept of Mulberry harbours began to take shape when Hughes-Hallett moved to be Naval Chief of Staff to the Overlord planners.

In July 1943 a committee of eminent civil engineers consisting of Colin R White (Chairman), J D C Couper, J A Cochrane, R D Gwyther and Lt. Col. Ivor Bell was established to advise on how a number of selected sites on the French coastline could be converted into sheltered harbours. The committee initially investigated the use of compressed air breakwaters before eventually deciding on blockships and caissons.

Trials
In August and September 1943 a trial of three competing designs for the cargo-handling jetties was set up together with a test of a compressed air breakwater. The pier designs were by:
 Hugh Iorys Hughes (a civil engineer) who developed his "Hippo" piers and "Crocodile" bridge spans;
 Ronald Hamilton (working at the Department of Miscellaneous Weapons Development) who devised the "Swiss Roll" which consisted of a floating roadway made of waterproofed canvas stiffened with slats and tensioned by cables;
 Lieutenant Colonel William T Everall and Major Allan Beckett (of the War Office's 'Transportation 5 Department' (Tn5)) who designed a floating bridge linked to a pier head (the latter had integral 'spud' legs that were raised and lowered with the tide).

The western side of Wigtown Bay, in the Solway Firth, was selected for the trials as the tides were similar to those on the expected invasion beaches in Normandy, a harbour was available at Garlieston, and the area's remoteness would simplify security matters. Prototypes of each of the designs were built and transported to the area for testing by Royal Engineers, based at Cairn Head and in Garlieston. The tests revealed various problems (the "Swiss Roll" would only take a maximum of a 7-ton truck in the Atlantic swell). However the final choice of design was determined by a storm during which the "Hippos" were undermined causing the "Crocodile" bridge spans to fail and the Swiss Roll was washed away.

Harbour elements and code names

Below are listed brief details of the major elements of the harbours together with their associated military code names.

Mulberry

Mulberry was the codename for all the various different structures that would create the artificial harbours. These were the "Gooseberries" which metamorphosed into fully fledged harbours. There were two harbours, Mulberry "A" and Mulberry "B". The "Mulberry" harbours consisted of a floating outer breakwater called "Bombardons", a static breakwater consisting of "Corncobs" and reinforced concrete caissons called "Phoenix breakwaters", floating piers or roadways codenamed "Whales" and "Beetles", and pier heads codenamed "Spuds". These harbours when built were both of a similar size to Dover harbour. In the planning of Operation Neptune the term Mulberry "B" was defined as, "An artificial harbour to be built in England and towed to the British beaches at Arromanches."

Mulberry "A"
The Mulberry harbour assembled on Omaha Beach at Saint-Laurent-sur-Mer was for use by the American invasion forces.  Mulberry "A" (American) was not as securely anchored to the sea bed as Mulberry "B" had been by the British, resulting in such severe damage during the Channel storm of June 19, 1944 that it was considered to be irreparable and its further assembly ceased, although it was quickly repaired and by June 23 the tonnage landed there surpassed that on June 18, and the tonnage continued to increase through the end of June. It was commanded by Augustus Dayton Clark.

Mulberry "B" ("Port Winston")
Mulberry "B" (British) was the harbour assembled on Gold Beach at Arromanches for use by the British and Canadian invasion forces. The harbour was decommissioned six months after D-Day as Allied forces were able to use the recently captured port of Antwerp to offload troops and supplies. Mulberry 'B' was operated by 20 Port Group, Royal Engineers under the command of Lt. Col. G C B Shaddick.

Breakwaters

Corncobs and Gooseberries (breakwater ships)
Corncobs were ships that crossed the English Channel (either under their own steam or towed) and were then scuttled to act as breakwaters and create sheltered water at the five landing beaches. Once in position the Corncobs created the sheltered waters known as Gooseberries.

The ships used for each beach were:
 Utah Beach (Gooseberry 1): , David O. Saylor, George S. Wasson, Matt W. Ransom, Willis A. Slater, Victory Sword and Vitruvius.
 Omaha Beach (Gooseberry 2): Artemas Ward, Baialoide, Courageous, Flight-Command, Galveston, George W. Childs, James W. Marshall, James Iredell  Illinoian, Olambala, Potter,  and Wilscox.
 Gold Beach (Gooseberry 3):  Alynbank, Alghios Spyridon, Elswick Park, Flowergate, Giorgios P., Ingman, Innerton, Lynghaug, Modlin, Njegos, Parkhaven, Parklaan, Saltersgate, Sirehei, Vinlake and Winha.
 Juno Beach (Gooseberry 4): Belgique, Bendoran, Empire Flamingo, Empire Moorhen, Empire Waterhen, Formigny, Manchester Spinner, Mariposa, Panos and Vera Radcliffe.
 Sword Beach (Gooseberry 5): Becheville, Empire Tamar, Empire Tana, Forbin and HNLMS Sumatra.

Phoenix caissons

Phoenixes were reinforced concrete caissons constructed by civil engineering contractors around the coast of Britain, collected and sunk at Dungeness in Kent and Pagham in West Sussex prior to D-Day. There were six different sizes of caisson (with displacements of approximately 2,000 tons to 6,000 tons each) and each unit was towed to Normandy by two tugs at around three knots. The caissons were initially sunk awaiting D-Day and then engineers refloated ("resurrected", hence the name) the Phoenixes. US Navy Captain (later Rear Admiral) Edward Ellsberg, already well known for quickly refloating scuttled ships at Massawa and Oran, was brought in to accomplish the task, though not without obtaining Churchill's intervention in taking the task away from the Royal Engineers and giving it to the Royal Navy. The Phoenixes, once refloated, were towed across the channel to form the "Mulberry" harbour breakwaters together with the "Gooseberry" block ships. Ellsberg rode one of the concrete caissons to Normandy; once there he helped unsnarl wrecked landing craft and vehicles on the beach.

Bombardons

The Bombardons were large  by  cross-shaped floating breakwaters fabricated in steel that were anchored outside the main breakwaters that consisted of Gooseberries (scuttled ships) and Phoenixes (concrete caissons). 24 bombardon units, attached to one another with hemp ropes, would create a  breakwater. During the storms at the end of June 1944 some Bombardons broke up and sank while others parted their anchors and drifted down onto the harbours, possibly causing more damage to the harbours than the storm itself. The design of the Bombardons was the responsibility of the Royal Navy while the Royal Engineers were responsible for the design of the rest of the Mulberry harbour equipment.

Roadways

Whales

The dock piers were code named Whales. These piers were the floating roadways that connected the "Spud" pier heads to the land. After the war many of the "Whale" bridge spans from Arromanches were used to repair bombed bridges in France, Belgium and the Netherlands. Such units are still visible as a bridge over the Noireau river in Normandy, Meuse River in Vacherauville (Meuse), as a bridge over the Moselle River on road D56 between Cattenom and Kœnigsmacker (Moselle) and in Vierville-sur-Mer (Calvados) along road D517. In 1954, some whales were also used to build two bridges (still visible) in Cameroon along the Edea to Kribi road. In the 1960s, three Whale spans from Arromanches were used at Ford Dagenham to allow cars to be driven from the assembly line directly onto car-carrying ships. A Whale span from Mulberry B that was reused after the war at Pont-Farcy was saved from destruction in 2008 by Les Amis du Pont Bailey, a group of English and French volunteers. Seeking a permanent home for the Whale span the group gifted it to the Imperial War Museum and it was returned to England in July 2015. After conservation work the span now features as part of the Land Warfare exhibition at Imperial War Museum Duxford.

Beetles
Beetles were pontoons that supported the Whale piers. They were moored in position using wires attached to "Kite" anchors which were also designed by Allan Beckett. These anchors had such high holding power that very few could be recovered at the end of the War. The Navy was dismissive of Beckett's claims for his anchor's holding ability so Kite anchors were not used for mooring the bombardons. An original Kite anchor is displayed in a private museum at Vierville-sur-Mer while a full size replica forms part of a memorial to Beckett in Arromanches. In October 2018 five Kite anchors were recovered from the bed of the Solent off Woodside Beach, which had been an assembly area for Whale tows prior to D Day. The anchors were taken to Mary Rose Archaeological Services in Portsmouth for conservation treatment.

Spud Piers
The pier heads or landing wharves at which ships were unloaded. Each of these consisted of a pontoon with four legs that rested on the sea bed to anchor the pontoon, yet allowed it to float up and down freely with the tide.

Deployment

On the afternoon of 6 June 1944 (D-Day) over 400 towed component parts (weighing approximately 1.5 million tons) set sail to create the two Mulberry harbours. It included all the blockships (codenamed Corncobs) to create the outer breakwater (Gooseberries) and 146 concrete caissons (Phoenixes).

Arromanches Mulberry
At Arromanches, the first Phoenix was sunk at dawn on 8 June 1944. By 15 June a further 115 had been sunk to create a five-mile-long arc between Tracy-sur-Mer in the west to Asnelles in the east. To protect the new anchorage, the superstructures of the blockships (which remained above sea-level) and the concrete caissons were festooned with anti-aircraft guns and barrage balloons.

Omaha Mulberry
Arriving first on D-Day itself were the Bombardons followed a day later by the first blockship. The first Phoenix was sunk on 9 June and the Gooseberry was finished by 11 June. By 18 June two piers and four pier heads were working. Though this harbour was abandoned in late June (see below), the beach continued to be used for landing vehicles and stores using Landing Ship Tanks (LSTs). Using this method, the Americans were able to unload a higher tonnage of supplies than at Arromanches. Salvageable parts of the artificial port were sent to Arromanches to repair the Mulberry there.

Storm of 19 June 1944
Both harbours were almost fully functional when on 19 June a large north-east storm at Force 6 to 8 blew into Normandy and devastated the Mulberry harbour at Omaha Beach. The harbours had been designed with summer weather conditions in mind but this was the worst storm to hit the Normandy coast in 40 years.

The destruction at Omaha was so bad that the entire harbour was deemed irreparable. 21 of the 28 Phoenix caissons were completely destroyed, the Bombardons were cast adrift, and the roadways and piers smashed.

The Mulberry harbour at Arromanches was more protected, and although damaged by the storm it remained usable. It came to be known as Port Winston. While the harbour at Omaha was destroyed sooner than expected, Port Winston saw heavy use for eight months, despite being designed to last only three months. In the 10 months after D-Day, it was used to land over 2.5 million men, 500,000 vehicles, and 4 million tons of supplies providing much needed reinforcements in France. In response to this longer than planned use the Phoenix breakwater was reinforced with the addition of specially strengthened caissons. The Royal Engineers had built a complete Mulberry Harbour out of 600,000 tons of concrete between 33 jetties, and had  of floating roadways to land men and vehicles on the beach. Port Winston is commonly upheld as one of the best examples of military engineering. Its remains are still visible today from the beaches at Arromanches.

Deception 
Some troops from the American Ghost Army went to Normandy two weeks after D-Day to simulate a Mulberry harbour. The deception was created in such a way that at night its lights drew German gunfire away from the real Mulberries.

Post-war analysis 
Post-war (particularly American) historians say that although it was a success, the vast resources used on the Mulberry may have been wasted, as the American forces were supplied mostly over the beaches without the use of a Mulberry right through to September 1944. By the end of 6 June, 20,000 troops and 1,700 vehicles had landed on Utah beach (the shortest beach). At Omaha and Utah, 6,614 tons of cargo was discharged in the first 3 days. A month after D-Day, Omaha and Utah were handling 9,200 tons, and after a further month, they were landing 16,000 tons per day. This increased until 56,200 tons of supplies, 20,000 vehicles, and 180,000 troops were discharged each day at those beaches. The Mulberry harbours provided less than half the total (on good weather days) to begin with. The Normandy Beaches supplied the following average daily tonnage of supplies:

By the end of June, over 289,827 tons of supplies had been offloaded onto the Normandy beaches.  Up to September, U.S. forces were supported largely across the beaches, primarily without the use of the Mulberry. "However, in the critical early stage of the operation, had the Allied assault ships been caught in the open without the benefit of any protection, the damage in the American sector especially could have been catastrophic to the lines of supply and communication."

"Mulberry B was substantially reinforced with units salvaged from the American harbor and that the Phoenixes were pumped full of sand to give them greater stability, measures that undoubtedly explain the extended service which the British port was able to render. Furthermore, the planners obviously underrated the capacities of open beaches.  The tremendous tonnage capacities subsequently developed at both Utah and Omaha were without doubt one of the most significant and gratifying features of the entire Overlord operation."

Surviving remnants in the UK

Sections of Phoenix caissons are located at:
 Thorpe Bay, Southend-on-Sea – while being towed from Immingham to Southsea, the caisson began to leak and was intentionally beached on a sandbank in the Thames Estuary. It was designated as a scheduled monument in 2004. It is accessible at low tide.
 Pagham, West Sussex – known as the Far Mulberry, it sank off the coast, settled and cracked and is now lying at about  underwater. The remains were scheduled in two sections in 2019.
 Littlestone-on-Sea, Kent – caisson could not be refloated. The site was scheduled in 2013.
 Langstone Harbour, Hayling Island – faulty caisson left in-situ at place of construction.
 Littlehampton - caissons about 5 metres underwater and dived by novice divers.
 Portland Harbour, Portland, Dorset – two are located at the beach at Castletown. They were designated as a Grade II listed building in 1993.
Beetles are located at:
 Bognor Regis, on the shore line West of Marine Drive, Aldwick, where it washed up a few days after D-Day. Easily accessible at low tide
 Garlieston, Wigtownshire - concrete beetle remains are accessible on foot on the north side of Garlieston Bay (Eggerness) and at Cairn Head on the south side of Portyerrock Bay on the road to Isle of Whithorn.

 Old House Point, Cairnryan, Dumfries and Galloway, 3 beetles at the shore line.
Other artefacts around Garlieston include:
 a conspicuous stone wall at the back of Rigg Bay beach: this was the landward terminal for a "Crocodile" link to a "Hippo"
 the remains of a collapsed "Hippo" visible at low tide in Rigg Bay
 a number of abandoned brick buildings, once the camp at Cairn Head
 some lengths of concrete roadway on the beach at Cairn Head, intended for use with "Swiss Roll".
At Southampton, Town Quay, a short section of 'Whale' roadway and a buffer pontoon, now derelict, used after the war for Isle of Wight ferries, survive between the Royal Pier and the Town Quay car ferry terminal.

German equivalent of Mulberry
In the period between postponement and cancellation of Operation Sea Lion, the invasion of the UK, Germany developed some prototype prefabricated jetties with a similar purpose in mind. These could be seen in Alderney, until they were demolished in 1978.

Daily Telegraph crosswords

"Mulberry" and the names of all the beaches were words appearing in the Daily Telegraph crossword puzzle in the month prior to the invasion. The crossword compilers, Melville Jones and Leonard Dawe, were questioned by MI5, which determined the appearance of the words was innocent. However, over 60 years later, a former student reported that Dawe frequently requested words from his students, many of whom were children in the same area as US military personnel.

See also
 Operation Pluto
 Lily: a floating airstrip using components developed for the Mulberry harbour.

Notes

References

Further reading

External links

 The Mulberry Harbours
 Google Maps satellite view
 A wartime aerial view of part of the Mulberry Harbour at Arromanches
 Papers of Alfred B. Stanford, deputy naval commander of Mulberry A, Dwight D. Eisenhower Presidential Library
 The Beckett Rankine Mulberry Harbour Archive
 D-Day's Sunken Secrets, PBS Nova program originally aired May 28, 2014, pertinent segment runs from approx. 1 hr., 35 min. mark through 1 hr. 45 min. mark
 Garlieston's Secret War
 
 

Operation Overlord
Military logistics of World War II
Coastal construction
Operation Neptune
British inventions
Military installations closed in 1945
Closed installations of the United States Navy